The 1928 Maine gubernatorial election took place on September 10, 1928. Incumbent Republican Governor Ralph Owen Brewster retired to run for U.S. Senate. Republican candidate William Tudor Gardiner defeated Democratic candidate Edward C. Moran Jr.

Results

References

Gubernatorial
1928
Maine
September 1928 events